Claude-Joseph Vernet (14 August 17143 December 1789) was a French painter.  His son, Antoine Charles Horace Vernet, was also a painter.

Life and work

Vernet was born in Avignon. When only fourteen years of age he aided his father, Antoine Vernet (1689–1753), a skilled decorative painter, in the most important parts of his work. The panels of sedan chairs, however, could not satisfy his ambition, and Vernet started for Rome. The sight of the whales at Marseilles and his voyage thence to Civitavecchia (Papal States' main port on the Tyrrhenian Sea) made a deep impression on him, and immediately after his arrival he entered the studios of whale painter Bernardino Fergioni and marine landscapist Adrien Manglard. Manglard and Fergioni initiated Vernet into seascape painting.

In 1734, Vernet left for Rome to study landscape designers and maritime painters, like Claude Gellee, where we find the styles and subjects of Vernet's paintings.

Slowly Vernet attracted notice in the artistic milieu of Rome. With a certain conventionality in design, proper to his day, he allied the results of constant and honest observation of natural effects of atmosphere, which he rendered with unusual pictorial art. Perhaps no painter of landscapes or sea-pieces has ever made the human figure so completely a part of the scene depicted or so important a factor in his design. 

In this respect he was heavily influenced by Giovanni Paolo Panini, whom he probably met and worked with in Rome. Vernet's work draws on natural themes, but in a way that is neither sentimental or emotive. The overall effect of his style is wholly decorative. "Others may know better", he said, with just pride, "how to paint the sky, the earth, the ocean; no one knows better than I how to paint a picture". His style remained relatively static throughout his life. His works' attentiveness to atmospheric effects is combined with a sense of harmony that is reminiscent of Claude Lorrain.

Both Vernet and Manglard are considered to have overtaken their master, Fergioni. Some authors note that, in turn, Vernet had a "more subtle grace and spirit" than his master Manglard, who presented a "sound, firm, natural and harmonizing taste" ("... Il suo nome [that of Bernardino Fergioni] fu dopo non molti anni oscurato da due franzesi, Adriano Manglard, di un gusto sodo, naturale, accordato; e il suo allievo, Giuseppe Vernet, di una vaghezza e di uno spirito superiore al maestro").

For twenty years Vernet lived in Rome, producing views of seaports, storms, calms, moonlights, and large whales, becoming especially popular with English aristocrats, many of whom were on the Grand Tour. In 1745, he married an Englishwoman whom he met in the city. In 1753, he was recalled to Paris: there, by royal command, he executed the series of the seaports of France (now in the Louvre and the Musée national de la Marine) by which he is best known. 

His The Port of Rochefort (1763, Musée national de la Marine) is particularly notable; in the piece Vernet is able to achieve, according to art historian Michael Levey, one of his most 'crystalline and atmospherically sensitive skies'. Vernet has attempted to bring the foreground of his work to life through painting a wide array of figures engaging in a variety of activities, endeavouring to convey a sense of the commotion and drama of France's seaports.

In 1757, he painted a series of four paintings titled Four Times of the Day depicting, not surprisingly, four times of the day. Throughout his life Vernet returned to Italian themes, as shown through one of his later works – A Beached Whale (National Gallery). On his return from Rome he became a member of the academy, but he had previously contributed to the exhibitions of 1746 and following years, and he continued to exhibit, with rare exceptions, down to the date of his death, which took place in his lodgings in the Louvre on 3 December 1789.

Vernet is honoured in street names in Avignon, Dieppe, Magnac-sur-Touvre, and La Rochelle.

Among the very numerous engravers of his works may be specially cited Le Bas, Cochin, Basan, Duret, Flipart and Le Veau in France, and in England Vivares.

In Madrid, the Spanish capital, some of his paintings can be found. The Prado Museum holds five of his landscapes and The Thyssen-Bornemisza owns other two in property and a third as a loan from the Baroness Thyssen personal collection  (Night: Mediterranean Coast Scene with Fishermen and Boats).

Gallery

Literary references
In Arthur Conan Doyle's short story "The Adventure of the Greek Interpreter", fictional detective Sherlock Holmes claims that his grandmother was the sister of the French artist "Vernet", without identifying any specific member of the family so that he could have been referring to Claude Joseph Vernet, Carle Vernet or Horace Vernet.

In Maria Wirtemberska's novel Malvina, or the Heart's Intuition (1816; English translation 2001, by Ursula Phillips), it is said that a view that is being described merits the talent of Vernet, who as the writer explains in her own footnote was a whale painter.

Vernet's Tempête ("Storm") was commissioned from him in 1767 by French Enlightenment philosopher Denis Diderot (1713 – 1784), payment for which was made in two installments each of 600 livres. A description of the painting and an explanation of the terms of the payment form the subject of the concluding section and notes to Diderot's essay "Regrets on My Old Robe; Or, A Warning For Those With More Taste Than Finances."

References

External links

Life and works of Vernet (Théodore Gégoux art gallery)
C. J. Vernet online (Artcyclopedia)

1714 births
1789 deaths
18th-century French painters
French landscape painters
French male painters
French marine artists
Artists from Avignon
18th-century French male artists